Thomas Griffin may refer to:
Thomas Griffin (died 1615), English landowner
Thomas Griffin (Australian gold commissioner) (1832–1868), police officer executed in 1868
Thomas Griffin (baseball) (1857–1933), of the Milwaukee Brewers
Thomas Griffin (boxer) (1913–1984), British boxer
Thomas Griffin (farmer) (1889–1915), African American farmer executed in 1915
Thomas Griffin (politician) (1773–1837), American lawyer and politician from Virginia
Thomas Griffin (Royal Navy officer) (1692–1771), British admiral and Member of Parliament for Arundel
Thomas Griffin (pirate), pirate and privateer active off New England
Tom Griffin (aviator) (died 2013), American aviator
Tom Griffin (baseball) (born 1948), of the Houston Astros, San Diego Padres, California Angels, San Francisco Giants, and Pittsburgh Pirates
Tom Griffin (playwright) (1946–2018), playwright
Tom Griffin (rugby) (1884–1950), Australian rugby union player
Tommy Griffin (born 1978), Irish Gaelic football player
Sir Thomas Griffin (1323–1360), English knight